Ferguson Findley (1910–1963) was the pen name of Charles Weiser Frey, an American novelist from Pennsylvania. He wrote several minor crime novels in the 1950s, the most successful of which, Waterfront, was adapted into the film The Mob in 1951.

Novels
 My Old Man’s Badge (also published as: Killer Cop) (1950)
 Hire This Killer (1951)
 Waterfront (UK Title: Remember That Face!) (1951)
 The Man in the Middle (UK Title: A Handful of Murder) (also published as: Dead Ringer) (1952)
 Counterfeit Corpse (1956)
 Murder Makes Me Mad (1956)

External links 
 

1910 births
1963 deaths
20th-century American novelists
American crime fiction writers
American male novelists
Novelists from Pennsylvania
20th-century American male writers